The third and final season of Narcos, an American crime thriller drama streaming television series produced and created by Chris Brancato, Carlo Bernard, and Doug Miro, follows the story of the Cali Cartel. Pedro Pascal reprises his role from the previous two seasons.

All 10 episodes of the season became available for streaming on Netflix on September 1, 2017 and were met with very positive reviews.

Narcos was initially renewed for a fourth season, but it instead became Narcos: Mexico, a prequel/sequel companion series.

Cast and characters

Main

 Pedro Pascal as Javier Peña, DEA agent tasked with taking down the Cali cartel
 Damián Alcázar as Gilberto Rodríguez Orejuela – the leader of the Cali Cartel and one of Pablo Escobar's primary rivals
 Alberto Ammann as Hélmer "Pacho" Herrera – a Colombian drug lord and high-ranking member of the Cali Cartel
 Francisco Denis as Miguel Rodríguez Orejuela – a high-ranking member of the Cali Cartel and Gilberto's younger brother
 Pêpê Rapazote as José "Chepe" Santacruz-Londoño – a high-ranking member of the Cali Cartel who oversees the group's operations in New York City
 Matias Varela as Jorge Salcedo Cabrera – the Cali Cartel's head of security
 Javier Cámara as Guillermo Pallomari – the chief accountant of the Cali Cartel
 Arturo Castro as David Rodríguez – Miguel's son
 Eric Lange as Bill Stechner – the CIA Station Chief in Colombia
 Andrea Londo as María Salazar – wife of a Colombian drug-lord affiliated with the North Valley cartel
 Kerry Bishé as Christina Jurado – the American wife of a banker affiliated with the Cali cartel
 Michael Stahl-David as Chris Feistl – DEA agent working under Peña
 Matt Whelan as Daniel Van Ness – DEA agent partnered with Feistl
 José María Yazpik as Amado Carrillo Fuentes - a Mexican drug trafficker allied with Pacho and the Cali cartel, known as "The Lord of the Skies" (season 3)

Recurring
 Juan Sebastián Calero as Navegante – a violent associate of the Cali Cartel who works as their top henchman
 Juan Pablo Shuk as Colonel Hugo Martínez - Carrillo's successor as the commander of Search Bloc
 Brett Cullen as Ambassador Arthur Crosby – A former Navy officer sent as US Ambassador to Colombia by George H. W. Bush in 1992, replacing Noonan
 Gaston Velandia as José Serrano – General of the Colombian National Police
 Roberto Cano as Darío – David Rodriguez’s partner in crime
 Sebastián Eslava as Nicolas Rodríguez – Gilberto's son
 Miguel Ángel Silvestre as Franklin Jurado
 Edward James Olmos as Chucho Peña – Javier's father
 Raymond Ablack as Stoddard 
 Shea Whigham as Agent Duffy
 Gabriel Iglesias as Dominican Gangster
 Carlos Camacho as Claudio Salazar
 Taliana Vargas as Paola Salcedo
 Bre Blair as Lorraine
 Wayne Knight as Alan Starkman
 Andrés Crespo as Carlos Córdova
 José María Yazpik as Amado Carrillo Fuentes

Episodes

Reception
On Rotten Tomatoes, the third season holds an approval rating of 97% based on 23 reviews, with an average rating of 7.46/10. The site's critical consensus reads, "Narcos continues to evolve in its third season, drawing on historical details to take viewers on a thoroughly gripping -- and unsettlingly timely -- journey into darkness." On Metacritic, season three holds a score of 78 out of 100, based on 9 critics, indicating "generally favorable reviews".

References

External links

 
 

Narcos
2017 American television seasons